Orycteropus abundulafus is an extinct species of aardvark. Its fossil was found in northern Chad. It lived in the Mio-Pliocene epochs.

References

Orycteropus
Neogene mammals of Africa
Fossil taxa described in 2005